Benoit Valentin (born 8 December 1992 in Écully) is a French freestyle skier, specializing in halfpipe.

Valentin competed at the 2014 Winter Olympics for France. He placed 3rd in the qualifying round in the halfpipe, advancing to the final. He finished 10th in the final, with a best run of 61.00 points.

As of April 2014, his best showing at the World Championships is 8th, in the 2011 halfpipe.

Valentin made his World Cup debut in January 2008. As of April 2014, he has four World Cup podium finishes, with his best results a pair of silver medals in 2010–11. He won the World Cup Crystal Globe, finishing 1st in halfpipe in 2010–11.

World Cup Podiums

References

1992 births
Living people
People from Écully
Olympic freestyle skiers of France
Freestyle skiers at the 2014 Winter Olympics
French male freestyle skiers
X Games athletes
Sportspeople from Lyon Metropolis